Mihai Horia Botez (18 November 194011 July 1995) was a Romanian mathematician and dissident, nicknamed "Romania's Sakharov" by the international press. A leading mathematician, he played a key role in founding the study of futurology in the Eastern European country, before becoming a critic of the communist regime's catastrophic economic policies. He survived four suspicious attacks, including a stabbing, a car ramming and a beating that left him hospitalized and which human rights groups blamed on the country's secret police.

Botez was granted asylum in the United States in 1987, before returning to Romania in 1989 after the Romanian Revolution.

He died on 11 July 1995, at the age of 54 in Bucharest.

References

1940 births
1995 deaths
20th-century Romanian mathematicians
Ambassadors of Romania to the United States
Permanent Representatives of Romania to the United Nations
20th-century diplomats